Legislative elections were held in the Russian Empire between January and March 1907. The Trudoviks emerged as the largest bloc in the second State Duma, winning 104 of the 518 seats. Only 26 MPs elected the previous year retained their seats. In Congress Poland, the National-Democratic Party won 34 of the 38 seats.

The new Duma was opened on 6 March, with Fyodor Alexandrovich Golovin elected as its president.

Results

References

Russia
Russia
Legislative
1907 01
Russia
Russia
Russia